P. Govinda Pillai (23 May 1926 – 22 November 2012) was a veteran Communist Party of India (Marxist) leader and ideologue from Kerala, India, and former Chief Editor of Deshabhimani.

Biography
Pillai was born on 23 May 1926 in Pulluvazhi, Perumbavoor, the son of Parameswaran Pillai and Parukuttyamma. He graduated with BA Hons. from St.Xaviers', Mumbai. He was elected as a member of Thiru-Kochi Assembly in 1951 and later as a member of the Kerala Assembly 1967–70. He was the Kerala Press Academy Chairman 1981–82. 

Pillai wrote and spoke widely on the subject of fine arts and served as the Chairman of the Kerala State Film Development Corporation and as the founding Director of the Centre for Development of Imaging Technology (C-DIT).

Pillai often appeared on Kairali TV, commenting on national and international events. His unfavorable critical remarks about E.M.S. Namboodiripad on various issues invited fierce backlash from the Communist Party of India (Marxist) politburo. The party saw it as "grave indiscipline" and publicly censured him on the issue. However, in 2010, he received the Janasevana Praveen from the V. Sambasivan Foundation.

He died on 22 November 2012 in Thiruvananthapuram, Kerala.

Bibliography

Books
 Marxum mooladhanavum (Marx and Capital)
 Isangalkkippuram  (Within "ism"s)
 Marxist saundaryashastram, udbhavavum valarchayum (Marxist aesthetics: origin and growth)
 Bhudakaalavum Munvidhiyum (Past and Prejudice)
 Frederick Engels – Snigdhanaya Sahakari Varishtanaya viplavakari 
 Mar Gregoriosinte Mathavum Marxisavum (Religion and Marxism of Mar Gregorios)
 EMS um Malayala Sahityavum   (EMS and Kerala literature)
 Kerala Navodhanam Oru Marxist Veekshanam Vol 1  (Kerala renaissance: A Marxist perspective Vol 1)
 Kerala Navodhanam Oru Marxist Veekshanam – Mathacharyar Mathanishedhikal  
 Mahabharatham Muthal Communism Vare (From Mahabharatha to Communism)
 Mulkraj Muthal Pavanan Vare (From Mulkraj to Pavanan)
 Aagolavalkaranam Maadhyamam Samskaram (Globalization Media Culture)
 EMS Namboothiripad – A Biography 
 Charles Darwin;Jeevithavum Kaalavum (2009) (Charles Darwin: life and times)
 Vynjanika viplavam-Oru samskarika charithram (2011) (Knowledge revolution: A cultural history)
 Guide book for Gramcii readers (joint author with EMS)
samskaravum navodhanavum translated by P. P. Sathyan.

Translations
 Kaattukadannal (Gadfly by Ethel Lilian Voynich)
 Bhoothakalavum Munvidhikalum (Past and Prejudice by Romila Thapar)

Awards
 2007: Abu Dhabi Sakthi Award (Scholarly literature)

References

External links
 "P. Govinda Pillai: Life Sktech" (in Malayalam). Grandhalokam. January 2007

Communist Party of India (Marxist) politicians from Kerala
Politicians from Kochi
1926 births
2012 deaths
Malayalam-language journalists
People from Ernakulam district
Indian Marxist writers
Malayalam-language writers
Writers from Kerala
20th-century Indian translators
Indian political writers
Kerala MLAs 1957–1959
Kerala MLAs 1967–1970
Indian male writers
20th-century Indian non-fiction writers
Journalists from Kerala
Indian male journalists
Recipients of the Abu Dhabi Sakthi Award